Inner Ear (established in 2007 in Bodø, Norway) is a Norwegian record label initiated and led by the brothers and jazz musicians Tore Johansen and Roger Johansen.

They opened Inner Ear to release their music when their former label, Gemini, closed. The name "Inner Ear" is based on "the fact that all musical creation, without exceptions, arises from the musicians own brains. They hear it by their "inner ear" before they play the music".

Discography

References

External links
 Inner Ear Official Website

Norwegian record labels
Norwegian companies established in 2007
Norwegian jazz
Companies based in Bodø
Record labels established in 2007